Altolamprologus compressiceps is a species of fish in the family Cichlidae. It is endemic to the shallow rocky areas of Lake Tanganyika. It is not considered threatened by the IUCN.

Description 
It is physically similar to its close relative A. calvus, though it is deeper-bodied and has a shorter snout.

Several local variants exist, and some may prove to be distinct species or subspecies. Some examples include:
 'Fire Fin'
 'Gold'
 'Gold Head Kasanga'
 'Kigoma'
 'Mutondwe'
 'Red Fin'
 'Yellow Chaitika'
 'Zaire Gold'

Evolutionary biology 
Lake Tanganyika holds at least 250 species of cichlid fish and there are still undescribed species in the lake. Almost all (98%) of the Tanganyika cichlids are endemic to the lake and it is thus an important biological resource for the study of speciation in evolution.

References

External links 

 FishGeeks Profile  Detailed profile including tank setup, feeding and husbandry.

compressiceps
Fish described in 1898
Taxa named by George Albert Boulenger
Taxonomy articles created by Polbot
Fish of Lake Tanganyika